The Chairman of the Kuomintang is the leader of the Kuomintang in the Republic of China. The position used to be titled as President (1912–1914), Premier (1919–1925), Chairman of the Central Executive Committee (1925–1938), Director-General (1938–1975), and Chairman (from 1975). The post is currently held by Eric Chu, who assumed the post on 5 October 2021, following the tenth direct election of the party leadership. The Chairman is now directly elected by party members for a term of four years and may be re-elected for a second term.

List of party leaders
 denotes acting leader.

Presidents (1912–1914)

Sun Yat-sen served as Premier of the Chinese Revolutionary Party between 8 July 1914 and 10 October 1919.

Premier (1919–1925)

Chairmen of the Central Executive Committee (1925–1938)

Collective leadership 
Following the death of Sun Yat-sen in 1925, the Central Executive Committee became the collective leadership of the Kuomintang. On 19 May 1926, the Central Executive Committee resolved to establish chairmanship. In March 1927, the collective leadership of the Committee was revived, the chairmanship was thus abolished until 7 December 1935. 

Members of the Committee include:

Director-General (1938–1975)

Chairpersons (from 1975)

List of eternal and honorary leaders 
 Eternal Premier: Sun Yat-sen
 Eternal Director-General: Chiang Kai-shek
 Honorary chairmen:
 Lien Chan (2005–2015)
 Wu Po-hsiung (2009–2015)

List of deputy party leaders

Vice Chairman of the Central Executive Committee (1935–1938)

Vice Directors-General (1938–1939; 1957–1965)

Vice Chairmen (from 1993)

Timeline

See also

 List of leaders of the Democratic Progressive Party
 Secretary-General of the Kuomintang
 Leader of the Chinese Communist Party

References

 
K
Kuomintang
Kuomintang
Kuomintang